Krokeidet is a suburban village in the borough of Fana in the municipality of Bergen in Vestland county, Norway.

Transport
The bus line 61 goes from the Nesttun terminal to Krokeide. Before the Bergen Light Rail between Byparken and Nesttun was opened in June 2011, the earlier line 560 buses drove between Krokeide and Bergen city centre. From Krokeide, there is a ferry route to Hufthamar in the municipality of Austevoll.

References

Villages in Vestland
Neighbourhoods of Bergen